"Club Bizarre" is a song recorded by German dance act U96, released in February 1995 as the second single from the album of the same name (1995). It was a hit in several countries, although it was not as successful as the act's previous single, "Love Religion", but became a top twenty hit in the Netherlands, Sweden and Austria. On the Eurochart Hot 100, the single peaked at number 28 in April 1995. It features uncredited vocals by Skadi Lange.

Critical reception
In his review of the Club Bizarre album, Larry Flick from Billboard said the song "shows it successfully trying smoother keyboard sounds that complement the simple, but cute hooks anchoring each cut." Pan-European magazine Music & Media wrote, "So unlike anybody else in Euro, the childlike songstress, the melody and the airy sample from Alannah Myles' A Song Instead Of A Kiss add up to music that's a new nursery rhyme for '90s kids." Head of music Bernd Albrecht by ORB Fritz/ Potsdam (Germany) enthused, "What a classic melody. You can hear at once that this song stands out off the whole Euro pack." In his 2020 book Move Your Body (2 The 90's): Unlimited Eurodance, Juha Soininen commented, "It mixed strangely ethereal trance sound and strings and added filtered vocals. In addition to that, it was released with a weird music video."

Chart performance
"Club Bizarre" went on to be a major hit in several European countries, peaking at number-one in Finland. It also made it to the Top 20 in Austria, Germany, the Netherlands and Sweden. Additionally, the single was a Top 30 hit in Belgium, as well as on the Eurochart Hot 100, where it reached its best position as number 28 in April 1995. In the United Kingdom, "Club Bizarre" peaked at number 70, but on the UK Dance Singles Chart, it hit number 25 on its first week in June 1996.

Music video
The accompanying music video for "Club Bizarre" was directed by Paul Morgans.

Track listings

 CD single
 "Club Bizarre" (airplay version) — 5:00
 "Club Bizarre" (club mix) — 5:15

 CD maxi / 12" maxi
 "Club Bizarre" (airplay version) — 5:00
 "Club Bizarre" (club mix) — 5:13
 "Club Bizarre" (helium mix) — 4:54
 "Club Bizarre" (bizarre) — 5:10

 12" maxi - UK
 "Club Bizarre" (the Candy Girl mix) — 6:10
 "Club Bizarre" (extended mix) — 6:28
 "Club Bizarre" (club mix) — 5:14
 "Club Bizarre" (Ken Doh mix) — 6:25
 "Club Bizarre" (acid dub mix) — 5:14
 "Club Bizarre" (acido mix) — 5:14

 12" maxi - Remixes / CD maxi - Remixes
 "Club Bizarre" (Mandala remix) — 5:23
 "Club Bizarre" (Perplexer remix) — 5:17
 "Club Bizarre" (DJ Tom and Norman remix) — 4:45
 "Club Bizarre" (Steve Baltes remix) — 4:58

Credits
 Artwork by H. Hoffman
 Sleeve design by D. Rudolph
 Produced by Matiz and AC 16

Charts

Weekly charts

Year-end charts

Brooklyn Bounce version

German house music duo Brooklyn Bounce covered the song on its 2001 album, Restart. The song was released the same year and achieved some success, particularly in Austria and the Netherlands where it was a top ten hit.

Track listing
 CD single
 "Club Bizarre" (single edit) — 3:46
 "Club Bizarre" (DJs @ work remix) — 6:33
 "Club Bizarre" (Headhunterz & Noisecontrollers RMX)

 CD maxi
 "Club Bizarre" (single edit) — 3:46
 "Club Bizarre" (club mix) — 7:39
 "Club Bizarre (reprise) — 2:10
 "Club Bizarre (classic mix) — 3:53
 "Superassbassmother" — 6:32

 12" maxi
 "Club Bizarre" (DJs @ work remix) — 6:33
 "Club Bizarre" (club mix) — 7:39
 "Club Bizarre" (DJ Scot Project remix) — 8:55
 "Club Bizarre" (Tomcraft remix) — 7:02

Credits
 Brooklyn Bounce version
 Produced by Dennis "Bonebreaker" Bohn and Matthias "Double M" Menck
 Recorded by Christoph Brüx
 Recorded, arranged, mixed, engineered, performed by Dennis "Bonebreaker" Bohn, Matthias "Double M" Menck and Christoph Brüx
 Vocals by Alexandra Cuevas-Moreno and Ulrica Bohn

Charts

Weekly charts

Year-end charts

References

1994 songs
1995 singles
2001 singles
Brooklyn Bounce songs
Epic Records singles
Number-one singles in Finland
Song recordings produced by Alex Christensen
Songs written by Alex Christensen
U96 songs